Samsung Galaxy Core Plus is an Android smartphone developed by Samsung Electronics. It was released in October 2013 and ran on Android 4.2.2 (Jelly Bean) and had a 4.3 inch display.

History 
The Samsung Galaxy Core Plus was announced and released in October 2013. This model became available mere months after the original Galaxy Core came out in May 2013. This release has been viewed as part of a strategy to deliver new handsets to keep consumer interest.

Specifications 
The Samsung Galaxy Core Plus had 4GB internal storage, expandable via microSD up to 64GB, along with 512MB RAM. It had an 1800 mAh battery and a 4.3 inch display. It was equipped with a 5 MP rear-facing and 0.3 MP front-facing camera.

There are other variants introduced in other markets that feature different specifications. For example, the Galaxy Core Plus released in the Taiwanese market and Europe shipped with 768 MB of RAM.
 This was noted for being inferior to the original Core model, which had 1 GB of RAM and 8GB internal storage.

See also 
Samsung Galaxy Core
Samsung Galaxy Core Prime
Samsung Galaxy

References 

Samsung Galaxy
Mobile phones introduced in 2013
Android (operating system) devices
Samsung mobile phones